Perniki is a small settlement on the Mežakla Plateau in the Municipality of Gorje in the Upper Carniola region of Slovenia.

References

External links
Perniki on Geopedia

Populated places in the Municipality of Gorje